Zubulake v. UBS Warburg is a landmark decision in the area of electronic discovery and the burden of costs for such discovery. It was released on May 13, 2003 and was written by Judge Shira A. Scheindlin of the United States District Court for the Southern District of New York. It is the first in a series of Zubulake judgements relating to discovery issues, and is also referred to as "Zubulake I". See section "Other Proceedings" for information on other Zubulake decisions.

Facts

In the context of a gender discrimination and retaliation lawsuit, the plaintiff Laura Zubulake moved to obtain from defendants UBS Warburg LLC, UBS Warburg and UBS AG ('UBS') "all documents concerning any communication by or between UBS employees concerning the Plaintiff." UBS responded by providing several documents, including e-mail records totaling 100 pages, but did not search its backup tapes or other archives for responsive e-mails. The Plaintiff requested emails from UBS' optical disks, servers and backup tapes.

According to the decision, UBS e-mails were automatically backed up on tapes and optical disks. Optical disks contained only the internal emails of registered traders. To restore a backup tape would take UBS approximately five days, although such restoration could be faster if using services available in the private sector for a higher price. Ninety-four backup tapes were identified as containing information relevant to Zubulake's request.

UBS objected to the plaintiff's request, stating that the cost associated with complying would be too high, which they estimated to be about $175,000 excluding the cost of lawyers reviewing the e-mails. Alternatively, the defendants asked that the plaintiff shoulder the cost of such electronic discovery.

Issues

The issues identified by the Court for consideration were:

1) Should discovery of UBS' electronic data be permitted?

2) Should cost-shifting be considered?

3) What is the proper cost-shifting analysis?

Laws considered by the Court

U.S. Federal Rules of Civil Procedure Rule 26(b)(1) states that "Parties may obtain discovery regarding any matter, not privileged, that is relevant to the claim or defense…" creating a wide scope for discovery.

Rule 26(b)(2) of the Rules limits the scope of discovery with proportionality considerations. For example, if "(iii) the burden or expense of the proposed discovery outweighs its likely benefit, taking into account the needs of the case, the amount in controversy, the parties' resources, the importance of the issues at stake in the litigation, and the importance of the proposed discovery in resolving the issues."

Rule 34 states that one may request the discovery of documents. This applies to electronic data, even if it may "be obtained only with the use of detection devices" where the "respondent may be required to use his devices to translate the data into usable form."

The Court also considered the legal presumption that the side which is responding to a discovery request should pay for the expenses incurred to comply with such a request. ('Oppenheimer presumption'). Although such a presumption exists, the Court does have the discretion (supported by Rule 26(c)) to have the requesting party pay the cost of the discovery if it would result in "undue burden or expense." This is known as "cost shifting." A leading judgment in this area considered by the Court in Zubulake I is The Rowe Entertainment eight factor test.

Analysis of the Issues by the Court (application of the law to the facts)

Should discovery of UBS' electronic data be permitted? 

Citing Rule 34, the Court in Zubulake I stated that electronic documents can equally be the subject of discovery as paper documents. Furthermore, this is equally valid for digital data on backup tapes.

Should cost-shifting be considered?

The Court clarified that cost-shifting need not be considered in all cases regarding electronic discovery of digital information, and that the Oppenheimer presumption should be respected.

The Court identified the standard for "undue" at 26(b)(2)(B) of the Rules. It clarified that it is wrong for courts to take the position that the standard for undue is met simply because electronic evidence is involved in a particular case. The Court explained that such a presumption is false because electronic evidence is often easier and cheaper to produce than paper evidence as it can be searched automatically, reducing the need for photocopying, etc.

Also, the Court stated that a factor relating to determining what is "undue" is whether the electronic data is in accessible or inaccessible form, which largely depends on the media it is saved to. The Court identified five classes of data and media according to its accessibility, starting with the most accessible and ending with the least accessible. To paraphrase the Court, the five classes identified were:

 Active, online data, such as data on a hard drive. This is the most accessible for of data since it is at its most active. For example, when data is created, accessed and processed the most.
 Near-line data, such as data contained on optical disks. Retrieval time is slightly slower than from, for example, a hard drive. However, it is still very accessible.
 Offline storage/archives data, which is when data is stored to an optical disk or magnetic tape for archival purposes because it was determined that the chance of needing access to the data is low. In this case, access is slower than near-line data because it requires manual retrieval. The speed of accessing such data can take days depending on storage facility arrangements.
 Backup tapes involves saving data to tape-recorder type of device and can hold up to many gigabytes of information. It is not possible to retrieve individual documents because backup tapes contain data which is recorded to mirror of each computer's structure. They also often involve compression of data. For these reasons, restoration of tapes and access to data is slow and costly.
 Erased, fragmented or damaged data is the least accessible form of data. Fragmented data occurs if data is stored in clusters.

The Court provided the guidance that, in general, the first three classes may be considered accessible while the last two may be considered inaccessible. In the specific case before the Court, it was found that there existed both accessible and inaccessible data, with active e-mail files falling into the first category, and e-mails saved to optical disk falling into the second or third category. Since backup tapes are a form of inaccessible data, the Court found it appropriate to consider cost-shifting for the recovery of e-mails from those tapes.

What is the proper cost-shifting analysis?

The Court examined the Rowe seven factor test and found that it favoured cost-shifting. To respect the Oppenheimer presumption and ensure that the test be neutral, the Court modified the Rowe test to the following seven factor test:

Further guidance was provided by the Court that these factors should not be weighed equally, but rather in descending order with the first two being given the most weight. Also, a factual basis is required to support the consideration of the factors. To do so, it may be possible to require that a small sample be recovered so as to determine whether the test is met.

Conclusion
The Court concludes by describing its three step approach regarding electronic discovery and costs for such discovery:

 Active and stored data of the computer system must be very well understood. Costs for retrieving accessible information should be covered by the responder. Only when retrieving inaccessible data should cost-shifting be considered.
 Due to the factual nature of the cost-shifting test, it may be prudent to request that a small sample of the inaccessible data be restored.
 Apply the cost-shifting test.

The Court ordered that the defendants: 

produce all responsive e-mails that exist on its optical disks or on its active servers (i.e., in HP OpenMail files) at its own expense. UBS is also ordered to produce, at its expense, responsive emails from any five backups tapes selected by Zubulake. UBS should then prepare an affidavit detailing the results of its search, as well as the time and money spent. After reviewing the contents of the backup tapes and UBS's certification, the Court will conduct the appropriate cost-shifting analysis.

Other Proceedings
Zubulake II -  also released on May 13, 2003 found that the plaintiff was not under an obligation to report alleged securities violations contained in a deposition to the Court.

Zubulake III - released on July 24, 2003 applied the cost-shifting test outlined in Zubulake I based on the sample recovery of data from five backup tapes. The Court found that the plaintiff should pay for 25 per cent of the cost of recovering the remainder of the back up tapes, as well as the cost to review the data for privileged information. The defendant was ordered pay 75 per cent of the cost of recovering the back up tapes.

Zubulake IV - issued on October 22, 2003 dealt with the issue of deleted e-mails which were not saved according to the UBS retention policy and in light of the impending litigation of the plaintiff. The plaintiff was not able to show the deleted e-mails would have supported her case. The defendants were nevertheless ordered to cover costs associated with re-deposing certain witnesses.

Zubulake V issued on July 20, 2004, involved the plaintiff wanting an adverse inference to the jury based on the defendants delays and incompleteness in providing requested e-mails from backup tapes. Also, the Court found that deleted e-mails prejudiced the plaintiff's case. The Court examined the issue of destruction of evidence, spoliation and duty of litigation hold.

Zubulake Revisited - In Pension Committee of the University of Montreal Pension Plan, et al. v. Banc of America Securities, LLC, et al., 05 Civ. 9016 released on January 11, 2010, Judge Scheindlin pens a judgement titled "Zubulake Revisited" regarding spoilation and litigation hold. (Scheindlin's ruling regarding litigation holds was rejected by the Second Circuit Court of Appeals in a different case.)

See also
 Electronic discovery

References

External links
 Zubulake I
 Overview of Zubulake decisions
 Overview of Zubulake Revisited decision

United States discovery case law
United States District Court for the Southern District of New York cases